The 2006 Turkish Cup Final was a football match played on 3 May 2006 at the İzmir Atatürk Stadium in İzmir. It was the final and deciding match of the 2005–06 Türkiye Kupası (Turkish Cup).

Rouute to the final

Match details

References

2006
Turkish Cup Final 2006
Turkish Cup Final 2006
Turkish Cup Final 2006